The Century 424 was a four-axle,  diesel-electric locomotive. 190 were built between April 1963 and May 1967. Cataloged as a part of Alco's Century line of locomotives, the C424 was intended to replace the earlier RS-27 model and offered as a lower-priced alternative to the C425. Montreal Locomotive Works also built this locomotive as MLW Century 424.

Original Owners

Locomotives built by Alco

Locomotives built by MLW

Preservation

 Toledo, Peoria and Western 801 is preserved as Morristown & Erie 19 by the Tri-State Railway Historical Society and in storage in Boonton, NJ
 Canadian Pacific 4237 is preserved at the Canadian Railway Museum in Saint-Constant, QC.
 Reading 5204 is preserved by the Reading Company Technical & Historical Society
 Toledo, Peoria and Western 800 is preserved as Morristown & Erie 18 at the Illinois Railway Museum in Union, IL
 Canadian Pacific 4230 is preserved as West Chester Railroad 4230 in West Chester, PA
 Canadian Pacific 4213 is preserved as West Chester Railroad 4213 in West Chester, PA

See also 
 List of ALCO diesel locomotives
 List of MLW diesel locomotives

References

External links

 Sarberenyi, Robert. Alco C424 Original Owners.

B-B locomotives
Century 424
Century 424
Diesel-electric locomotives of the United States
Railway locomotives introduced in 1963
Standard gauge locomotives of Canada
Standard gauge locomotives of the United States
Standard gauge locomotives of Mexico